Flycatcher may refer to:

Birds

Major flycatcher families
 Old World flycatchers, Muscicapidae
 Tyrant flycatchers, Tyrannidae

Minor flycatcher families
 Fairy flycatchers, Stenostiridae
 Monarch flycatchers, Monarchidae
 Silky-flycatchers, Ptiliogonatidae
 Yellow flycatchers, Erythrocercidae

Other birds known as flycatchers
 Flycatcher thrushes or Rufous thrushes, in the thrush family Turdidae
 Flycatchers or flyrobins, in the Australasian robin family Petroicidae
 Bearded flycatchers or Myiobius, in the passerine family Tityridae
 Dohrn's flycatcher or Dohrn's thrush-babbler, in the warbler genus Sylvia

Other uses
HMS Flycatcher, a former UK military base.
 Fly-killing device
 Flycatcher (comics), a character in the Vertigo comic book Fables
 Flycatcher (radar), a short range air defense fire control system
 Fairey Flycatcher, a British fighter aircraft of the 1920s–1930s
 "The Frog Prince", a fairy tale, some of whose versions are dubbed "Flycatcher"

Animal common name disambiguation pages